Ali Asghar Bazri (born September 11, 1980 in Behshahr, Mazandaran, Iran) is an Iranian wrestler who competed in the 2006 Asian Games in the 74 kg division and won the gold medal.

References
Profile (2006 Asian Games Website)

1980 births
Living people
Iranian male sport wrestlers
Asian Games gold medalists for Iran
Asian Games medalists in wrestling
Wrestlers at the 2006 Asian Games
World Wrestling Championships medalists
Medalists at the 2006 Asian Games
People from Behshahr
Sportspeople from Mazandaran province
21st-century Iranian people